William Rose Bock (5 January 1847 – 3 August 1932) was a New Zealand engraver, medal designer, illuminator, stamp designer, lithographer and publisher.

Bock was born in Hobart, Tasmania, where his father Thomas Bock was a notable engraver, lithographer and daguerrotypist, important for his paintings of Tasmanian Aborigines. Bock left for New Zealand in 1868, settling in Wellington. In the 1870s he was responsible for the design and preparation of the dies for the first fiscal and postage stamps to be produced wholly in New Zealand.

In 1878 Bock founded his own firm, in Wellington, New Zealand, first with Henry Elliot and then with Alfred Ernest Cousins. His firm Bock and Cousins published The Art Album of New Zealand Flora by Sarah Featon and her husband, Edward Featon, in 1889. It was the first fully coloured book to be printed in New Zealand. He designed and illuminated many formal addresses to members of the Royal Family.

Bock was also a cricketer who represented Wellington in minor matches in the 1870s. Later he became an umpire. He umpired eight first-class cricket matches in Wellington between 1909 and 1928. He turned 80 the day before his final match, between Wellington and Otago at the Basin Reserve. He is the only known octogenarian to have stood as an umpire in a first-class cricket match. He was also a singer, especially active in choirs up until his death.

References

1847 births
1932 deaths
New Zealand publishers (people)
New Zealand engravers
New Zealand stamp designers
Australian emigrants to New Zealand
People from Hobart
New Zealand cricket umpires